Luinne Bheinn (939 m) is a mountain in the Northwest Highlands of Scotland, on the Knoydart Peninsula in Lochaber.

The mountain is rough and rocky. The most common route to climb it starts from Inverie.

References

Mountains and hills of the Northwest Highlands
Marilyns of Scotland
Munros